Karayakupovo culture was an archaeological culture in the Southern Ural. The researchers of Karayakupovo culture together with Kushnarenkovo archaeological culture think these the Ugrians, the ancestors of the Hungarians or ancient Bashkirs.

Karayakupovo culture fits into the edge of the historic Bashkortostan 9th-10th centuries. Sometimes it is called the culture of early Bashkirs.

The cultural dwellings 
Karayakupovskoe, Old Kalmashevskoe, Chatrinskoe, Taptykovskoe, Kushnarenkovskoe, Chukraklinskoe, Duvaneyskoe, Sasykulskoe, Davlekanovskiy etc. settlements.

Area of the dwellings of 1 000 square meters. They are located on high ground, were reinforced by one or two low walls and moats.

Ritual cremation
The culture is also represented by earthen mounds with a diameter of 8–10 m and a height of 40–60 cm over the graves. Near the graves and within them there are traces of ritual burial horse (skins, heads and four legs). People were buried in wooden coffins.

The bottom is littered coffins, woolen cloth. Coffins before lowering into the grave for holding of the fire. This simulated ritual cremation. The feet of the dead is often associated with ropes - to the dead man could not stand up and do harm to survivors. On the coffin and put leather bridle sets. Sometimes near the grave dug pits for placing caches in them saddle and bridle sets.

Literature
 История башкирского народа : в 7 т./ гл. ред. М.М. Кульшарипов ; Институт истории, языка и литературы УНЦ РАН. Уфа.: изд. Гилем, 2012. - 400 с.: ил. - . т. 2. – 2012. – 
 Иванов В.А. Путями степных кочевий. Уфа, Башкнижиздат, 1984, С. 38-58.
 Васюткин С.М. Некоторые спорные вопросы археологии Башкирии. СА, №1, 1968, с. 69-71; Археологическая карта Башкирии. М., 1976, с. 31, 32.
 Мажитов Н.А. Новые материалы о ранней истории башкир. Уфа, АЭБ, Т.2, 1964б, с. 104-108; 1968, с. 69, 70.
 Матвеева Г.И., 1968а, 1975; Мажитов Н.А. Южный Урал в VII-XIV вв. Москва, 1977, с. 60-74.
 Мажитов Н.А. Курганный могильник в деревне Ново-Турбаслы//Башкирский археологический сборник. Уфа, 1959, с. 125, рис. 3; Матвеева Г.И., 1968б, рис. 19.
 Мажитов Н.А. Бахмутинская культура. М., 1968, табл. 26.
 Мажитов Н.А. Южный Урал в VII-XIV вв. Москва, 1977, с. 63, 73, 74, табл. XXI, XXII.
 Мажитов Н.А. Южный Урал в VII-XIV вв. Москва, 1977, с. 17, 19.
 Ковалевская В.Б., Краснов Ю.А. Рецензия на книгу Эрдели//СА, №2, 1973, с. 287; Амброз А.К. Рецензия на книгу Эрдели//СА, №2, 1973б, с. 297.
 Матвеева Г.И. Памятники караякуповского типа в Приуралье//Из истории Среднего Поволжья и Приуралья. Куйбышев, вып.5, 1975, с. 19; Генинг В.Ф., 1972, с. 270-272.
 Старостин П.Н. Памятники именьковской культуры//САИ, вып. Д1-32, 1967, с. 21, 26, табл. 13, 13, 15.
 Генинг В.Ф. Азелинская культура III-V вв//Вопросы археологии Урала. Ижевск, вып.5, 1963, с. 26, 27, табл. XXIV, 5.
 Ахмеров Р. Б. Уфимские погребения VI-VIII вв. н.э. и их место в древней истории Башкирии//Древности Башкирии. М., 1951, с. 126-131.

References

Iron Age cultures
Ugric peoples
History of Ural
Bashkir people